Dihydroquinine, also known as hydroquinine, is an organic compound and as a cinchona alkaloid closely related to quinine. The specific rotation is −148° in ethanol. A derivative of this molecule is used as chiral ligand in the AD-mix for Sharpless dihydroxylation.

See also  
 Dihydroquinidine

References 

Secondary alcohols
Phenol ethers
Quinoline alkaloids
Quinuclidine alkaloids